Nha Trang Airport may refer to the 2 airports serving Nha Trang, Khánh Hòa Province, Vietnam.
The original airstrip at Nha Trang USAFB was built by the French Air Force in 1949. It was subsequently operated by the Vietnamese Air Force and US Air Force.

 Cam Ranh International Airport  - for civil use
 Nha Trang Air Base  - previously used for both civil and military purposes, but civil use has been transferred to Cam Ranh Airport.